Trasharama A-Go-Go is an Australian annual short film festival catering to the low-budget/no-budget end of the movie-market, focusing on genre films (Horror & Sci-fi) under 15 minutes in length. The Festival began 1997, providing emerging horror film makers with  a competitive environment to develop their craft and showcase films to audiences, effectively acting as a de facto training ground.

The Festival was conceived by Dick Dale, frontman of Adelaide bands Gacy's Place and Kamikaze. Although having started in Adelaide, South Australia the festival has gained local and national sponsorship allowing it to grow in size and popularity,  featuring both national and international submissions and now tours Australia with screenings in most Australian states.

Trasharama A-Go-Go is promoted as "Australia's NASTIEST Short Film FESTERval". Although no festival was held in 2010, the festival returned the following year. Since 2015 the Trasharama agogo film festival has held its annual premiere in conjunction with Melbourne's Monster Fest .

List of films screened sorted by year 

1994 – A taste of what was to become the Trasharama festival, one-off screening held at the Crown and Anchor Hotel.
Blue Dog – Dir. Dick Dale. Followed by performances by local bands Blood Sucking Freaks and Taxed.

1997 – "Trash Film Night" – eleven films from Adelaide and Brisbane, followed by performances by the bands, Blood Sucking Freaks and The Ghouls, screening held at "Mad Love Bar" band venue.
Films screened included:
Total Recession – Durand Greig
No Smoking – Warren Mc Carthy & Julian Summers
Cold Comfort – Kristian Moliere

1998 – "Trash Film Night 2" – Held in Producers Hotel beer garden. Screening of 11 Australian films followed by live performances by the bands Madonna's Armpits and Fear and Loathing. 
Films screened included:
The Creature from Outta Space- Sean Wessex Brown & Justin Peacock
Attack of the Undead- Peter Spierig
Vicious Mink- Timothy Spanos & Dean Keep.

1999 – Trasharama A-Go-Go is held at Mercury Cinema in Adelaide, Revolver Nightclub in Melbourne and Side on Cafe in Sydney.
Films screened included:
Hot Crusty Death- Judd Tilyard
Blood of a woman- Jonathan Sequeria
Making a Death Mask- Mark Nichols

2000 – Trasharama A-Go-Go is held at Mercury Cinema in Adelaide, The Zoo in Brisbane, Side on Cafe in Sydney and Revolver in Melbourne.
Films screened included:
Black Lindy/ White Lindy- Timothy Spanos
The film John Lennon couldn't make- Rupert Da Costa E Silva
Zombie Bride Blood Bath- Justin Case

2001 
Films screened included:
Mondo Excreta- Little Clarke May
Westvale Road- Episode 1 Holy Crap- Dylan Perry
Rampage of the Undead- Peter Spierig
Nicholas Dickmuncher- Timothy Spanos

2002 
Festival only held in South Australia in 2002, at Mercury Cinema in Adelaide.
Films shown comprised a "best of" selection from previous years.

2003
Screenings held in Adelaide, Sydney, Melbourne, Brisbane and Perth.
Films screened included:
The Denim Avenger VS The Undead Bogans – Andy Kite and Rebecca Bogert
The Twilight of Granitar – Warren Armstrong
Arakned, Apex of Zombies – Bonnie Hart
Case #406 – Paul Nicholson
Bad Company – Aaron Cartwright

2004
Screenings held in Adelaide, Brisbane, Sydney, Melbourne, Perth, Caloundra, Geelong and Newcastle.
Films screened included:
We Almost Got Shot – Tom Priestley and Bill Flowers
ZZZZ – James Findley
Laser Beetles From Venus – Dario Russo
Head – Peter Duggan
The Offering – John Anthony Silvestro
Drop Bears -Brendon Dee
The Scent of a Man – Shaun Mccarthy
Pencil Dick – Joe Villanti

2005
Travelled widely around Australia.
Films screened included:
Best Of 3 – Drew Thompson
Hair Removal – Troy Gillett
Return of the Killer Bikini Vampire Girls – John Anthony Silvestro
Dracenstein – Tom Priestley and Bill Flowers
Still Born – Emma Mitchell
A Story, A Song and a Dream – Matt Penney

2006
Travelled widely around Australia.
Films screened included:
Final Faeces – Frank Daft
Wok – Mark Alston
Remake – Kit McDee
Killer Bikini Vampire Girls Strike Back – John Anthony Silvestro
The Patrolman – Anthony Marriott & Marc Jager
The Morning After – Daniel Knight
Sickie – Stuart Simpson

2007
Travelled widely around Australia.
Films screened included:
Greedy Guts – Stu Simpson
Dog Meat – Mat Govoni
Numb Skulls – Kelly Sheeran
Foetal Decision – Mitchell Bowker
Off The Beaten Track – Josh Long
Killer Bikini Vampire Girls 3: A New Hope – John Anthony Silvestro
Road Kill – Sam Curtain
I Piss in Your Eye – Trent Saunders
The Physique of the Christ – Bill Flowers & Tom Priestley
Bad Timing – James Teh
Cheerleader Swapmeat – Steve Kruetzmann & Qtim Broad
Betty Burgers – Summer DeRoche
Dan The Dogman – James MacDonald

2008
Travelled widely around Australia.
Films screened included:
Rabbit Rage (First place)
Look to the skies – Liam Jennings & Ben Nichols (Second place)
Money Shot
Mooney Street
The Good Ship Morning Dew
Death of the Killer Bikini Vampire Girls
The Life of Piglet
Look to the Skies
Stop The Barbies
Killin' Flies
Heartbreak Motel
Do You Have Protection
Garden of Earthly Delights
Dr. Poo
The Day I Got Sacked
The Box Monster & The Death Bag of Death
My New Ghoul Friends
The Love of Victoria Anus
The Dog Sex Killer
Danny (The Dog Who Farts Fire)
Family Bizness

2009
Monster Mash – Timothy Stewart, SA
The Golden Rule – David Wade, SA
Dirtbike Dero's – Macho Lama, SA
Cereal Killer – Daniel Vink, SA
The Decayed – Josef J Weber, SA
Vengeance wears a Tampon – Frank Daft, SA
The Tramp – Max Miller, Vic
Gumbys new Tit – Alex Machin, Vic
Potential Employee – Andrew Dunstan, Vic
The Body Watchers – Adam Spellicy, Vic
Hanging at Picnic Rock- Clint Cure, Vic
The Fish that Eat People – Ross Radiation, NSW
Attack of the killer bananas – Karina Libbey, NSW
The Bagman Genisus – Kade Ruckman, NSW
Have sex and die! – James Peniata, NSW
Violet is Dead – Thomas Cruikshank, QLD
Cravings – Jonathon Jahnke, QLD
Bound – Marcus Ditzel, QLD
A dark beginning – Aston Wenham, Simon Gill, Stephen Cass, QLD
Duncan Cunningham's Nightmare – Duncan Cunningham, QLD
Revenge of the Gnomes – Phillip Nelson, WA
Trapped – Matt Penny WA
Granny Basher Stinkweed and the Vic Bitter Bandits – Griff Broham, WA
Blood Shed – Jason Shipley, Canada
Mammoth Mammoth – Mat Govoni, Vic
Botched eyeball operation – Clint Enns, Canada

References 

Film festivals in Adelaide
Underground film festivals
Film festivals established in 1997
1997 establishments in Australia